The 2009 USASA National Women's Cup was the 14th edition of the annual national soccer championship, won by the Chicago Eclipse Select with a 3-1 victory over the New York Athletic Club.  The Eclipse beat NYAC in the semifinals of the 2008 Women's Amateur the previous year as well before losing to the Turbo D'Feeters in the Amateur final.

Regional Phase

Region I
NYAC beat Danubia in the final, with the Classic Crush (of Massachusetts) and the Peninsula Aztecs as the losing semifinalists.

Region II
Six teams were divided into two groups, with the group winners facing off for Region II's national semifinal slot. The Chicago Eclipse Select won their group and then beat the Kentucky Wanderers to move forward. The group runners-up were J.B. Marine S.C. and Women's SC United, followed by FC Indiana and the AAFC Elite.

Region III
The Houston Challengers won a three-team group, with runners-up Triad United Aces and third-place Lynch's Irish Pub.

Region IV

National Finals

Semi-finals

Final

References

2009
Open
United